Matúš Digoň (born 18 November 1988) is a Slovak football player who currently plays for MFK Vranov nad Topľou.

References

External links

Ligy.sk profile 
Futbalnet profile 
Eurofotbal profile 
MFK Košice profile 

1988 births
Living people
Slovak footballers
Association football forwards
MFK Slovan Giraltovce players
FC VSS Košice players
FC Lokomotíva Košice players
MFK Vranov nad Topľou players
FK Slavoj Trebišov players
Slovak Super Liga players